Edward Alfred Parland, russified and commonly known as Alfred Aleksandrovich Parland, rechristened since 1916 as Attik Aleksandrovich Parland ( — 16 September 1919), was a Russian architect of Scottish descent best known as the designer of the Church of the Savior on Blood, a masterpiece of the Russian Revival style.

Early years and education
A merchant family, the Parlands came to Russia in the late 18th century; the architect's paternal grandfather, John Parland, has taught English to Tsar Paul I's children, and his maternal grandfather owned a factory in Stuttgart. As a boy, Parland first studied at the St. Petersburg 4th Gymnasium (In 1836, on the 6th line of Vasilievsky Island, 15, Fourth Classical (Larinskaya) Gymnasium for the sons of local merchants and "foreign negociants" was opened). Then he went at the Stuttgart Polytechnical School. In 1862 Parland enrolled in the Imperial Academy of Arts. During his studies he was awarded five medals for his achievements in painting and architecture. On graduation in 1871 he received a gold medal along with the right to travel abroad on a grant of the Academy.

Work

During his career, Parland designed several religious buildings, the most famous of which is the Church of the Resurrection of Christ in St. Petersburg. This building became the main work of Parland's life, as it was built over a quarter-century, and Parland oversaw the construction of the church until its completion in 1907. Afterward, he was responsible for its maintenance. 
The fencing at the church was created in 1903-1907, following Parland's designs. This fencing has beautiful patterns formed by shod links with a large vegetative ornaments. It is characteristic of the early modernist style. The fencing stretches from the Benois Wing of the Russian Museum on the embankment of the Griboyedov Canal to the Moyka River.

Among the buildings designed by Parland is the Holy Resurrection Cathedral of the Coastal Monastery of St. Sergius, which was designed immediately after Parland graduated from the St. Petersburg Imperial Academy of Fine Arts in 1877—1884.  He was also responsible for the renovation of the Znamenskaya Church of the Life-Guards Horse-Grenadier Regiment (not preserved) in Petergof in 1896. In 1910–1911 Parland joined the Committee for the Restoration of Kazan Cathedral.

Recognition
Parland was offered a professorship in 1892, and in 1905 was made an honorary member of the Academy of Arts. In 1907, after the completion of the Church of the Resurrection, Parland joined the staff of the Ministry of the Imperial Court and was awarded several medals in his career path. Parland also was professor of Greek and Roman architecture at the Academy of Arts in St. Petersburg .

Death
Parland died unmarried and childless, in St. Petersburg in 1919. He is buried in the Smolensky Lutheran Cemetery in St. Petersburg Vasilyevsky Island.

Notes

References

Further reading 
General studies
 
 
Reference works

External links
 170th Anniversary of Alfred Parland

1842 births
1919 deaths
Art Nouveau architects
Russian architects